The second season of the American sitcom The Big Bang Theory aired on CBS from September 22, 2008 to May 11, 2009. A DVD consisting of all 23 episodes of the season was released on September 15, 2009, and a Blu-ray version was reissued on July 10, 2012, with remastered surround sound audio, whereas the DVD version only had stereo. 

Jim Parsons submitted the episode "The Bath Item Gift Hypothesis" for consideration due to his nomination for the Primetime Emmy Award for Outstanding Lead Actor in a Comedy Series at the 61st Primetime Emmy Awards. In 2009, TV Guide ranked the episode #60 on its list for the 100 Greatest Episodes. Christine Baranski submitted the episode "The Maternal Capacitance" for consideration due to her nomination for the Primetime Emmy Award for Outstanding Guest Actress in a Comedy Series at the 61st Primetime Emmy Awards.

Cast

Main cast 
 Johnny Galecki as Dr. Leonard Hofstadter
 Jim Parsons as Dr. Sheldon Cooper
 Kaley Cuoco as Penny
 Simon Helberg as Howard Wolowitz
 Kunal Nayyar as Dr. Rajesh "Raj" Koothrappali
 Sara Gilbert as Leslie Winkle

Recurring cast 
 Carol Ann Susi as Mrs. Wolowitz
 Mark Harelik as Dr. Eric Gablehauser
 Brian George as Dr. V.M. Koothrappali
 Alice Amter as Mrs. Koothrappali
 John Ross Bowie as Dr. Barry Kripke
 Sara Rue as Dr. Stephanie Barnett
 Christine Baranski as Dr. Beverly Hofstadter
 Kevin Sussman as Stuart Bloom
 Brian Patrick Wade as Kurt

Guest cast 
 Travis Schuldt as Eric
 Charlie Sheen as himself
 Octavia Spencer as DMV employee
 Riki Lindhome as Ramona Nowitzki
 Lio Tipton as themself
 Emily Happe as Kathy O'Brien
 Samantha Potter as herself
 Michael Trucco as Dr. David Underhill
 Summer Glau as herself
 George Smoot as himself
 Valerie Azlynn as Alicia
 Jodi Lyn O'Keefe as Mikayla

Episodes 

<onlyinclude>

{{Episode table

|background = #02A9A3

|overall    = 5  
|season     = 6  
|title      = 19
|director   = 11
|writer     = 31
|airdate    = 11
|prodcode   = 7 
|country    = U.S.
|viewers    = 10
|episodes   = 

{{Episode list/sublist|The Big Bang Theory (season 2)
|EpisodeNumber   = 39
|EpisodeNumber2  = 22
|Title           = The Classified Materials Turbulence
|DirectedBy      = Mark Cendrowski
|WrittenBy       = 
|OriginalAirDate = 
|ProdCode        = 3T7373
|Viewers         = 9.25
|ShortSummary    = Howard celebrates the launch of his latest invention, a zero-gravity human-waste disposal system (a toilet) to be used in the ISS, by buying all of his friends new comic books. However, later Howard discovers he made a mistake that will cause the toilet to fail and burst after 10 flushes, so the guys convene to try and fix it (referencing Apollo 13'''s Ken Mattingly), working for a whole night to find a solution and even testing the toilet with meatloaf made by Howard's mother. Howard 's fix fails and the ISS astronauts all go on an unscheduled "spacewalk". At the comic book store, Stuart tells Leonard that he is having a second date with Penny and asks for advice. Leonard deliberately avoids Stuart for as long as possible, and finally gives him bad advice. The next day, Leonard feels guilty and goes to apologize to him. Stuart reveals the date went well until they started making out in his car and Penny accidentally called him "Leonard". Leonard is secretly delighted.Title reference: The classified "space toilet" that Howard and the guys try to repair.
|LineColor       = 02A9A3
}}

}}</onlyinclude>

 Reception 
Compared to season one, the second season received critical acclaim. Jessica Paff of Screener wrote that "if they can keep the funny coming, I will keep watching", Ken Tucker of Entertainment Weekly praised the improvements to the character of Sheldon Cooper, writing that "Prickly Sheldon has become a character to love, and [actor Jim] Parsons is doing something rare on network TV: making intellectualism admirable, even heroic", and James Chamberlin of IGN'' wrote that "Jim Parsons is a riot and is reason enough to tune in each week."

Notes

References 

General references

External links

2008 American television seasons
2009 American television seasons
The Big Bang Theory seasons